Iriaka Matiu Rātana  (née Te Rio; 25 February 1905 – 21 December 1981) was a New Zealand politician and Rātana morehu who won the Western Maori electorate for Labour in 1949. She succeeded her husband Matiu Rātana to become the first woman to represent Māori in the New Zealand Parliament. She held the electorate until her retirement in 1969.

Early life
An entertainer from an early age, she was a member of the Rātana kapa haka groups and travelled with them throughout New Zealand and overseas. In 1925, she married Tahupōtiki Wiremu Rātana to become his second wife and had two children. Hamuera, the oldest died from tuberculosis in 1934, and the second, Raniera Te Aohou Ratana later became head of the Rātana church.

Following her husband's death in 1939, Rātana married Matiu Rātana, a son of T. W. Rātana. The couple farmed until the death in 1945 of Matiu's elder brother, Toko Rātana who was Member of Parliament (MP) for the Māori electorate of Western Maori. Matiu Rātana was elected in the 1945 election and held the seat until his accidental death in 1949.

Political career

Iriaka Rātana's decision to stand for parliament was opposed by those supporting traditional leadership roles, with Te Puea Hērangi speaking out against her claim to "captain the Tainui canoe". Only the strong backing of the Rātana church and her threat to stand as a Rātana Independent secured her the Labour Party nomination.

She won the Western Maori electorate for Labour in the 1949 general election. She succeeded her husband Matiu Ratana to become the first woman to represent Māori in the New Zealand parliament. She got a similar majority (6317) to her husband in 1946 (his majority was 6491), but no fewer than seven independent candidates stood against her; they got 116 to 326 votes each.

In May 1959 she was injured in a three-car accident near Sanson in which three people were killed. Among those killed were her farm manager, Charles Larkin, and Larkin's adopted seven-year-old son, Rangi. Rātana and the others injured in the crash were taken to Palmerston North Hospital. One of the others injured was Pat Curran, a Labour member of the Auckland City Council. She was initially on the seriously ill list, but stabilised.

As an MP, Rātana was concerned with welfare issues for Māori. She worked hard to improve living standards, particularly at the church settlement of Rātana Pā. She held the electorate until her retirement in 1969.

Rātana was appointed an Officer of the Order of the British Empire, for services to the Māori people, in the 1971 New Year Honours. She died on 21 December 1981 in Wanganui Hospital and was buried at Aramoho Cemetery.

References

 Henderson, James Mcleod (1963). Ratana The Man, The Church, The Movement (1st ed.) A.H & A.W. Reed Ltd .
Women in Parliamentary Life 1970–1990: Hocken Lecture 1993 by Marilyn Waring, page 34 (Hocken Library, University of Otago, 1994) 

1905 births
1981 deaths
New Zealand Labour Party MPs
Rātana MPs
Women members of the New Zealand House of Representatives
New Zealand MPs for Māori electorates
Members of the New Zealand House of Representatives
New Zealand Officers of the Order of the British Empire
Burials at Aramoho Cemetery
20th-century New Zealand politicians
20th-century New Zealand women politicians